Virtual environment software refers to any software, program or system that implements, manages and controls multiple virtual environment instances (self definition). The software is installed within an organization's existing IT infrastructure and controlled from within the organization itself. From a central interface, the software creates an interactive and immersive experience for administrators and users.

Uses
Virtual environment software can be purposed for any use, from advanced military training in a virtual environment simulator to virtual classrooms. Many Virtual Environments are being purposed as branding channels for products and services by enterprise corporations and non-profit groups.

Currently, virtual events and virtual tradeshows have been the early accepted uses of virtual event services. More recently, virtual environment software platforms have offered choices to enterprises – with the ability to connect people across the Internet. Virtual environment software enables organizations to extend their market and industry reach while reducing (all travel-related) costs and time.

Background
Providers of virtual environments have tended to focus on the early marketplace adoption of virtual events. These providers are typically software as a service (SaaS)-based. Most have evolved from the streaming media/gaming arena and social networking applications.

This early virtual event marketplace is now moving towards 3D persistent environments, where enterprises combine e-commerce, social media as core operating systems, and is evolving into virtual environments for branding, customer acquisition, and service centers. A persistent environment enables users, visitors and administrators to re-visit a part or parts of the event or session. Information gathered by attendees and end users is typically stored in a virtual briefcase typically including contact information and marketing materials.

Advantages
Virtual environment software has the potential to maximize the benefits of both online and on-premises environments. A flexible platform would allow companies to deploy the software in both environments while having the ability to run reports on data in both locations from a centralized interface. The advent of 'persistent environments' lends itself to a rich integration with enterprise technology assets which can be solved efficiently through the implementation of software.

Virtual environment software can be applied to virtual learning environments (also called learning management systems or LMS). In the US, universities, colleges and similar higher education institutions have adopted virtual learning environments to economize time, resources and course effectiveness.

Future
Virtual events, trade shows and environments are not projected to replace physical events and interactions. Instead, they are seen as extensions and enhancements to these physical events and environments by increasing lead generation and reaching a wider audience while decreasing expenses. The virtual environments industry has been projected to reach a market size in the billions of dollars.

Market availability
Virtual environment software is an alternative to bundled services. Companies known to provide virtual environment software are UBIVENT, InterCall or vcopious. But it is also possible to find SAAS tools to create virtual environments of your own such as Panoraven, Matterport, WPVR, Klapty, etc.

See also
Active Worlds virtual reality multi-user 3D chat platform
Blaxxun virtual reality multi-user 3D chat platform
Flux, freely downloadable VRML/X3D editor/browser, released by authors of these standards
List of vector graphics markup languages
MeshLab open source mesh processing system that can export VRML/X3D
OZ Virtual
Seamless3d
Virtual tour
Web3D

References

External links
Virtual World - Virbela
Virtual Reality In The Event Industry
5 Types Of Popular Virtual Reality Technologies

Technology
Virtual reality
Graphics standards
3D computer graphics
Vector graphics markup languages